The 2017–18 National Basketball League (Czech Republic) season is the 25th season of the Czech NBL.

Format
Teams in regular season play home and away against every other team in a round-robin tournament, before being split into two groups of six teams for playing again home and away against the teams from the same group.

After the end of the stage after the first split, the six teams from to top group and the two first qualified teams from the bottom group joined the play-offs.

The other four teams would play again home and away against themselves for avoiding the relegation.

Teams

Olomoucko replaced Ariete Prostějov, which was relegated from the previous season and was dissolved.

Regular season

Standings

Second stage

Group A1

Group A2

Playoffs
Seeded teams played at home games 1, 2, 5 and 7, while the third place game where played with a best-of-three format, playing the seeded team the matches 1 and 3 at home, and the finals in a double-legged one.

Relegation group

Relegation playoffs

|}

Clubs in European competitions

Clubs in international competitions

References

External links
NBL official website 

Czech Republic
Basketball
National Basketball League (Czech Republic)